Wegscheid is a municipality in the district of Passau in Bavaria in Germany.

In November 1936, Fritz Wächtler visited the school. 

In January 1939, when the Adalbert-Stifter school was dedicated, Kreisleiter Krenn joined the guests of honor.

References

Passau (district)